Mohan Joshi Hazir Ho! is a 1984 Hindi art film, made by Saeed Akhtar Mirza, based on his own story, during the Parallel Cinema period of Indian cinema.

The film is a comic satire on a judicial system, where cases drag on for decades, where plaintiffs either die or lose hope and money, while the corrupt run scot free, thanks to their nexus with corrupt lawyers.

It won the 1984 National Film Award for Best Film on Family Welfare.

Plot
An elderly couple, Mohan Joshi (Bhisham Sahni) and his wife (Dina Pathak), sues their landlord (Amjad Khan) for not maintaining their 'collapsing' apartment building. For this, they hire two cunning lawyers (Naseeruddin Shah and Satish Shah), while Rohini Hattangadi is the opposition lawyer.

The court case drags on for years and the lawyers milk the old couple dry, while they become rich. Back home in the society, the old couple is ridiculed for fighting the landlord, but they fight on nevertheless.

In the end, when the judge comes to check the condition of the chawl, the landlord's men prop up the place, thus convincing the judge that all is well. Finally, Joshi gathers all his strength and pulls down the temporary supports put up by the men causing the building to collapse on himself.

Cast
 Naseeruddin Shah as Advocate Malkani
 Bhisham Sahni as Mohan Joshi
 Dina Pathak as Joshi's wife
 Deepti Naval
 Mohan Gokhale
 Rohini Hattangadi as Advocate
 Pankaj Kapur as Promoter 1
 Amjad Khan as Kundan Kapadia, landlord
 Satish Shah as Advocate
 Salim Ghouse as Promoter 2
 Anjali Paigankar as Joshi's Son's girlfriend

Location
Mohan Joshi Hazir Ho! was shot at Kamithapura, Bapty Road, and Duncan Road (Two Tanks/Do Tanki) at Mumbai's middle-class Hindu Muslim locality.

References

External links 
 

1984 films
1980s Hindi-language films
Indian satirical films
Best Film on Family Welfare National Film Award winners
Films about landlords
Films directed by Saeed Akhtar Mirza
Indian courtroom films
Indian legal drama films